Born for This! is a studio album by American singer Stephanie Mills. It was released by Lightyear Entertainment on August 3, 2004 in the United States. The album features re-arranged productions of Mills's hit songs such as "Never Knew Love Like This Before" and "Something in the Way (You Make Me Feel)" as well as new songs she had not recorded before. It debuted and peaked at number 25 on the US Top R&B/Hip-Hop Albums.

Critical reception

In his review for AllMusic, editor Andy Kellman called the album a "solid album of contemporary R&B, most of which differs thematically (i.e., heartbreak, devotion, romance) from 1995's gospel-oriented Personal Inspirations. Surrounded by associates of Whitney Houston, Faith Evans, and Will Downing, Mills has made an album of mostly subdued and lightly upbeat material that will please her grown-up fan base. Mills is in such fine, with-the-times form that you could be fooled into thinking that she never went away."

Track listing

Charts

References

2004 albums
Stephanie Mills albums
Lightyear Entertainment albums